San Marino is an independent and sovereign member of the international community. It maintains an extensive diplomatic network relative to its diminutive size, as well as an active foreign policy and international presence.

International organizations
Among other international organizations, San Marino is a full member of the following international organizations:
 United Nations
 International Court of Justice
 United Nations Educational, Scientific and Cultural Organization (UNESCO)
 International Monetary Fund (IMF)
 World Health Organization (WHO)
 World Tourism Organization (WTO)
 Council of Europe
 International Committee of the Red Cross
 International Criminal Court (ICC)
 International Institution for the Unification of Private Law (UNIDROIT)

It also cooperates with UNICEF and the United Nations High Commissioner for Refugees and has official relations with the European Union.

From May 10 until November 6, 1990, San Marino held the semi-annual presidency of the Committee of Ministers of the Council of Europe. The second San Marino Chairmanship of the Committee of Ministers of the Council of Europe was from November 2006 until May 2007.

Diplomatic relations
As of 2021, San Marino maintains diplomatic relations with 145 United Nations members, Holy See, Kosovo, and the Sovereign Military Order of Malta, and furthermore maintains consular relations with Haiti and Iran:

UN Secretary General visits and remarks
On 31 March-1 April 2013, United Nations Secretary-General Ban Ki-moon was the official orator on the occasion of the newly elected Captains Regent. “Although this country is small, your importance to the United Nations stands as tall as Mount Titano,” the Secretary-General told the country's highest officials, the two Captains Regent, in reference to the country's 739 meter UNESCO World Heritage Site. Mr. Ban also noted that the country accepted five times as many refugees as its population during the Second World War, and praised its emphasis on protecting human rights. This has been the second visit to San Marino by a UN Secretary General, the first being Boutrous Boutrous-Gali's visit in 1996.

Bilateral relations

See also
List of diplomatic missions of San Marino
List of diplomatic missions in San Marino

References

External links
San Marino Secretary of State website
San Marino Chairmanship of the Committee of Ministers of the Council of Europe

 
Government of San Marino